Abell 907 is a galaxy cluster in the Abell catalogue.

See also
 List of Abell clusters

References

907
Galaxy clusters
Abell richness class 1